Operetta is a 1940 German musical film directed by Willi Forst and starring Forst, Maria Holst and Dora Komar. The film was made by Wien-Film, a Vienna-based company set up after Austria had been incorporated into Greater Germany following the 1938 Anschluss. It is the first film in director Willi Forst's "Viennese Trilogy" followed by Vienna Blood (1942) and Viennese Girls (1945). The film portrays the life of Franz Jauner (1832–1900), a leading musical figure in the city. It is both an operetta film and a Wiener Film.

Cast
 Willi Forst as Franz Jauner
 Maria Holst as Marie Geistinger
 Dora Komar as Emmi Krall, Jauner's wife
 Paul Hörbiger as Alexander Girardi
 Leo Slezak as Franz von Suppé
 Edmund Schellhammer as Johann Strauss II
 Curd Jürgens as Karl Millöcker
 Siegfried Breuer as Fürst Hohenburg
 Gustav Waldau as Ferdinand, Emmi's teacher
 Theodor Danegger as Tundler
 Trude Marlen as Antonie Link
 Viktor Heim as Hans Makart
 Alfred Neugebauer as Count Esterhazy
 Heinz Woester as Prof. Dr. Eichgraber
  as Dr. Molzer, lawyer
 Gisa Wurm as Frau Bramezberger
 Wilhelm Leicht as theatre director in Krems
 Fred Hülgerth as tenor Czika
 Lia Bayer
 Franz Borsos
 Lorenz Corvinus
 Hans Fetscherin
 Pepi Glöckner-Kramer
 Hansi Koller
 Hill Larsen
 Klaus Pohl
 Oskar Pouché
 Ernst Reitter
 Johannes Roth
 Louis Soldan
 Josef Stiegler
 Agnes Tassopulos
 Oskar Wegrostek

References

Bibliography 
 Hake, Sabine. Popular Cinema of the Third Reich. University of Texas Press, 2001.

External links 
 
 Operette Full movie at the Deutsche Filmothek

1940 films
Films of Nazi Germany
German historical musical films
1940s historical musical films
Operetta films
Films set in Vienna
Films set in the 19th century
Films directed by Willi Forst
Austrian historical musical films
German black-and-white films
1940s German-language films
1940s German films